Events from the year 1351 in Ireland.

Incumbent
Lord: Edward III

Events

Aodh, son of Toirdhealbhach Ó Conchobhair, recovers kingship of Connacht; expels Aodh mac Feidhlimidh Ó Conchobhair.
 October 17 – Great council occurs in Dublin.
 October 31 – Great council occurs in Kilkenny; ordinances to curtail Gaelisization of Anglo-Irish, and the statute of labourers applied to Ireland. 
 Christmas – 'Nodlaig na Garma'; convention of poets and men of learning is held by Uilliam Buide Ó Ceallaigh; commemorated in Gofraidh Fionn Ó Dálaigh's poem, .

Births

Deaths

References

"A New History of Ireland VIII: A Chronology of Irish History to 1976", edited by T. W. Moody, F.X. Martin and F.J. Byrne. Oxford, 1982. .
http://www.ucc.ie/celt/published/T100001B/index.html
http://www.ucc.ie/celt/published/T100005C/index.html
http://www.ucc.ie/celt/published/T100010B/index.html

 
Years of the 14th century in Ireland
1350s in Ireland
Ireland